The 1992–93 Iraqi National Clubs First Division was the 19th season of the competition since its foundation in 1974. The league title was won by Al-Talaba for the fourth time in their history. The league was 69 rounds long (totalling 828 matches) in total, the most rounds in any season in the competition's history, with the Iraq Football Association (IFA) deciding that no player could play more than 46 matches. Players that had been selected for the Iraq national team were released for international duty by their clubs after round 24, after which they did not participate in any more league matches.

After 46 rounds, the IFA decided to remove the four lowest-placed teams from Baghdad along with the lowest-placed team from outside Baghdad, and replaced them with five new teams to play the remaining 23 games in their place, with each new team adopting the record of the club they had replaced.

Name changes
Al-Tayaran renamed to Al-Khutoot.

League table

Results

Rounds 1–46

Rounds 47–69

Season statistics

Top scorers

Hat-tricks

Notes
4 Player scored 4 goals

Awards
 Top scorer: Karim Saddam (Al-Zawraa)
 Best Player/MVP: Mohammed Abdul-Hussein (Al-Minaa)
 Best Young Player: Waleed Dhahid (Al-Quwa Al-Jawiya)
 Best Coach: Ammo Baba (Al-Quwa Al-Jawiya)

References

External links
 Iraq Football Association

Iraqi Premier League seasons
1992–93 in Iraqi football
Iraq